1991: The Year Punk Broke, released theatrically in 1992, is a documentary directed by Dave Markey, featuring American alternative rock band Sonic Youth on tour in Europe in 1991. While Sonic Youth is the focus of the documentary, the film also gives attention to Nirvana, Dinosaur Jr., Babes in Toyland, Gumball and The Ramones. Also featured in the film are Mark Arm, Dan Peters and Matt Lukin of Mudhoney, and roadie Joe Cole, who was murdered in a robbery three months after the tour ended. The film is dedicated to Cole.

Several scenes in the film involve re-enactments and references to scenes from the contemporaneous Madonna tour documentary, Truth or Dare, such as Gordon complaining about "industry people" in the front row, or Cobain, introduced as "Costner" telling Sonic Youth that their show was "neat". At a screening of the film at the 2008 All Tomorrow's Parties festival in Monticello, New York, Markey mentioned that the working title for the film was Tooth or Hair, as a further play on this connection. A home video VHS was released by the David Geffen Company on April 13, 1993.  The film was again re-released on DVD on September 13, 2011 by the Universal Music Group.

Cast
Sonic Youth
 Kim Gordon
 Thurston Moore
 Lee Ranaldo
 Steve Shelley

Babes in Toyland
Lori Barbero
Kat Bjelland
Michelle Leon

Dinosaur Jr.
Mike Johnson
J Mascis
Murph

Gumball
Don Fleming
Jay Spiegel
Eric Vermillion

Mudhoney
Mark Arm
Matt Lukin
Dan Peters

Nirvana
Kurt Cobain
Dave Grohl
Krist Novoselic

Ramones
C. J. Ramone
Joey Ramone
Johnny Ramone
Marky Ramone

Others
Nic Close
Joe Cole
Dave Kendall
Courtney Love
Dave Markey
Craig Montgomery
Bob Mould of Hüsker Dü
Susanne Sasic
Peter Van Der Velde - tour manager
Dave Evans - driver

Songs included in the film
The songs included in the film are:
Sonic Youth - “Schizophrenia”
Nirvana - “Negative Creep”
Sonic Youth - “Brother James”
Nirvana - “School”
Sonic Youth - “Teen Age Riot”
Dinosaur Jr. - “Freak Scene”
Babes In Toyland - “Dust Cake Boy”
Sonic Youth - “Dirty Boots”
Nirvana - “Endless, Nameless”
Sonic Youth - “I Love Her All The Time”
Gumball - “Pre”
Dinosaur Jr. - “The Wagon”
Sonic Youth - “Mote”
Nirvana - “Smells Like Teen Spirit”
The Ramones - “Commando”
Sonic Youth - “Kool Thing”
Nirvana - “Polly”
Sonic Youth - “Expressway To Yr. Skull”

Tour dates
The film takes place over the course of Sonic Youth and Nirvana's 1991 European tour. The European dates, given at the beginning of the film, are as follows:

Charts

Original 1993 VHS release

2011 DVD re-release

References

External links
 
 
 
 
 
 
 
Dave Markey's 1991 tour diary

1992 films
Films set in 1991
American documentary films
Documentary films about punk music and musicians
Alternative rock
Grunge
Nirvana (band)
Sonic Youth
1992 documentary films
1990s English-language films
1990s American films